Mount Takamagahara (高天原山, Takamagahara-yama) is a mountain in the Gunma Prefecture of Japan, near Ueno village. Takamagahara is the world of heaven in Japanese mythology.

Claiming the lives of 520 people, it is the deadliest single-aircraft accident in aviation history.

This area was later renamed as Osutaka no One ("Mountain Ridge of Mount Osutaka") by the village mayor of Ueno, Takeo Kurosawa (Former Imperial Japanese Navy Lt Cdr). There is a shrine on the summit of the ridge to commemorate the lives lost in the crash of JAL123. The mountain road to the shrine was constructed as part of a compensation package from JAL.

References

See also
Takamagahara - a place of Japanese mythology

Takamagahara